À la conquête de l'air is a 1901 French silent film directed by Ferdinand Zecca and distributed by Pathé Frères. Based on contemporary accounts of aviation developments, À la conquête de l'air stars Ferdinand Zecca as the pilot of a fantastic flying machine. Aviation film historian Michael Paris considered the film, the first French aviation film and among the first to feature an aircraft in flight.

Zecca was hired by company founder Charles Pathé to invigorate the pioneering cinema company that had mainly been involved in documentary film. With an emphasis on new topics, Zecca expanded into short films that explored everything from everyday events to fantastic flight of fancy. His other films included comedies, trick films, or fairy tales, such as Les Sept châteaux du Diable, both 1901, and La Belle au bois dormant in 1902, as well as social dramas like Les Victimes de l'alcoolisme (1902), Au pays noir (1905) and reconstructions of actual events, the most famous being La Catastrophe de la Martinique (1902).

Plot
In 1901, a strange flying machine, called Fend-l'air, was seen flying over the rooftops of Belleville.

Cast
 Ferdinand Zecca as the pilot

Production
Zecca had filmed himself in the strange contraption suspended from the studio roof with the camera having half the frame blocked. The film was then rewound and the Belleville, Paris city landscape was shot in the previously blacked-out portion, creating the first split-screen effect. The entire film only has a running time of approximately one minute.

References

Notes

Bibliography

 Austin, Guy.Contemporary French Cinema: An Introduction. Manchester, UK: Manchester University Press, 1996. .
 Lanzoni, Rémi Fournier. French Cinema: From Its Beginnings to the Present. New York: Continuum International Publishing Group, 2004. .
 Paris, Michael. From the Wright Brothers to Top gun: Aviation, Nationalism, and Popular Cinema. Manchester, UK: Manchester University Press, 1995. .
 Rège, Philippe. Encyclopedia of French Film Directors, Volume 1. Lanham, Maryland: Scarecrow Press, 2009. .

External links
 
 

1901 films
French silent short films
French aviation films
French black-and-white films
Films directed by Ferdinand Zecca